LDN is usually contractional slang for London, UK.

LDN may also refer to:

Arts and media
 London Daily News, former newspaper
 BBC London (formerly BBC LDN), broadcasting body
 "LDN" (song), a 2006 single by Lily Allen

Language
 Láadan, a feminist, sci-fi conlang (by ISO 639-3 code)

Science and technology
 Low dose naltrexone
 Day-night average sound level, Ldn or DNL
 Linked Data Notifications, a communications protocol

Transport
 Llandanwg railway station, Gwynedd, Wales (by National Rail station code)